The first season of The Fosters premiered on June 3, 2013 and ended on March 24, 2014. The season consisted of 21 episodes and stars Teri Polo and Sherri Saum as Stef Foster and Lena Adams, an interracial lesbian couple, who foster a girl (Maia Mitchell) and her younger brother (Hayden Byerly) while also trying to juggle raising twin teenagers (Cierra Ramirez and Jake T. Austin) and Stef's biological son (David Lambert). Some other characters included in season one of "The Fosters" include Mike, Brandon's biological father (Danny Nucci), and Talya, Brandon's girlfriend (Madisen Beaty).

Cast

Main cast
 Teri Polo as Stef Foster
 Sherri Saum as Lena Adams
 Jake T. Austin as Jesus Foster
 Hayden Byerly as Jude Jacob
 David Lambert as Brandon Foster
 Maia Mitchell as Callie Jacob
 Danny Nucci as Mike Foster
 Cierra Ramirez as Mariana Foster

Recurring cast
 Madisen Beaty as Talya Banks
 Bianca A. Santos as Lexi Rivera
 Alex Saxon as Wyatt
 Jay Ali as Mr. Timothy
 Daffany Clark as Daphne Keene
 Amanda Leighton as Emma
 Alexandra Barreto as Ana Gutierrez
 Julian de la Celle as Zac Rogers
 April Parker Jones as Captain Roberts 
 Reiley McClendon as Vico Cerar
 Cherinda Kincherlow as Kiara
 Gavin MacIntosh as Connor Stevens
 Tom Phelan as Cole
 Marla Sokoloff as Dani Kirkland
 Hayley Kiyoko as Gabi
 Norma Maldonado as Karina Sánchez
 Alicia Sixtos as Carmen
 Brandon W. Jones as Liam Olmstead
 Garrett Clayton as Chase Dillon
 Lorraine Toussaint as Dana Adams
 Sam McMurray as Frank Cooper
 Annie Potts as Sharon Elkin
 Romy Rosemont as Amanda Rogers
 Rosie O'Donnell as Rita Hendricks

Guest cast
 Stephen Collins as Stewart Adams
 Jamie McShane as Donald Jacob
 Suzanne Cryer as Jenna Paul

Episodes

Production

Conception
The Fosters was originally conceived by openly gay creators Bradley Bredeweg and Peter Paige who wanted to write a drama that reflected the "modern American family". After originally considering a story about two gay fathers, the pair decided the subject of two men raising a family had already been done on television and began to instead consider a story about two women. When asked about the concept of two lesbian mothers raising a blended family, Bredeweg stated, "We realized that there was a kind of a vacuum when it came to stories about women raising families. So we set off in that direction. Many of our own friends are moms raising biological kids. Some of them have fostered and adopted. Suddenly, we realized that we had a story here that hadn't been told on television before." Additionally, certain elements of the series which deal with the foster care system are said to have been inspired by a troubled childhood friend of Bredeweg, who struggled in the foster system before eventually being adopted in her senior year of high school.

Development

When developing the concept, Bredeweg and Paige were initially met with some resistance from Hollywood, with Bredeweg recounting, "[T]here were some people around us, some people in town who said, 'You know, it is just not going to happen. You are never going to sell this show.'" After completing the first draft of the pilot script, the team was introduced to Jennifer Lopez through a friend who worked at her production company Nuyorican Productions, which was looking to branch out into scripted television. When describing their initial pitch to Lopez, Bredeweg stated, "When we met with Jennifer, she really fell in love with it. The moment we had her, we knew that we had a force behind us."

Lopez's decision to become involved in the project is said to have been largely inspired by her late Aunt Marisa, Lopez's mother's gay elder sister who had faced discrimination during her lifetime due to her sexual orientation and was unable to have a family of her own. When discussing the show's concept, Lopez stated, "Although [the script] was about a non-traditional family and had some newer themes, it had some really basic themes as well about family and love and what's really important. And life can be complicated and messy sometimes and not simple. It gives a really good depiction of family in this day and age."

With Lopez on board, the team took the concept to several networks, including ABC Family, with Bredeweg recalling, "ABC Family was really receptive from the very beginning. Strangely, it felt a little like a match made in heaven. I mean, their slogan is 'A new kind of family.' We had a new kind of modern family, and it took off from there." On July 6, 2012, The Hollywood Reporter, among other sources, reported that Jennifer Lopez and her production company, Nuyorican Productions, were developing the yet-to-be-titled hour-long drama for ABC Family, with Lopez set to executive produce alongside Simon Fields and Greg Gugliotta, as well as showrunners and head writers Peter Paige and Brad Bredeweg.

Finally, the first televised promo appeared on ABC Family on April 19, 2013.

Casting
On August 23, 2012, sources reported that ABC Family had ordered a pilot for The Fosters, a series which would tell the story of a lesbian couple raising a "21st-century" multi-ethnic mix of foster and biological children. On September 24, 2012, it was reported that Teri Polo and Sherri Saum had been cast to star in the pilot as the two leads, Stef Adams Foster and Lena Adams Foster respectively.

On February 6, 2013, it was reported that ABC Family had picked up the show, with production set to begin that spring for a summer 2013 premiere. The rest of the principal cast was also announced at that time, including Danny Nucci as Stef's ex-husband Mike Foster, David Lambert as their biological son Brandon Foster, Jake T. Austin and Cierra Ramirez as Stef and Lena's adopted twins Jesus and Mariana Foster, and Maia Mitchell and Hayden Byerly as their foster children Callie and Jude Jacob.

When recounting the casting process, Bredeweg explained, "[W]e spent tireless hours trying to find the right person for each role. Then they all began to line up—it was like dominos—the moment we found our Lena, the moment we found our Callie, the moment we found our Stef, it sort of all started to line up perfectly for us." On April 11, 2013, TV Guide unveiled the first official cast photo of The Fosters.

References

2013 American television seasons 
2014 American television seasons
The Fosters (American TV series)